The Adventures of Quik & Silva is a platform video game originally released on May 10, 1991, in the United Kingdom for the Amiga and Atari ST. The game was developed by members of Kaiko pseudonymously as New Bits On The RAM (Possibly a play on New Kids on the Block) and was first published as a covermounted disk in Amiga Fun magazine. The game was made available in 1992 as public domain software, with the Amiga version reviewed in issue 18 of Amiga Power.

The various enemies in the game are based on characters from other titles, such as Bubble Bobble, Nebulus, R-Type, and Super Mario. As the game was released as a cover-disk game, it was able to avoid possible copyright infringement for a few months. The game was not available outside of the UK during its cover-disk release and only started to gain traction when it had become public domain software.

This game is also notable for being the first home video game to feature Sonic the Hedgehog, in an unofficial capacity, as an enemy.

Development 

The title was built in two weeks by three people, allowing New Bits On The RAM to publish and ship the title almost immediately. The game spans eight levels, following two alternating styles of overworld and underground.

Notes

References

External links
 The Adventures of Quik & Silva at Atari Mania
 The Adventures of Quik & Silva at Lemon Amiga

1991 video games
Amiga games
Atari ST games
Public-domain software
Video games scored by Chris Huelsbeck
Video games developed in Germany